Philip Lee Edwards (born 8 November 1985) is an English professional footballer who plays as a defender for Northern Premier League Premier Division club Warrington Town.

Edwards began his football career at Wigan Athletic, progressing through the club's youth system before signing a professional contract at the age of 18. In September 2004, Edwards joined Morecambe on a month's loan, playing one game before returning to Wigan. He was loaned out again during the 2005–06 season, this time to Accrington Stanley in October 2005. He subsequently signed for the club permanently in January 2006, helping them win the Conference National. He spent five years at Accrington, playing over 250 games for them in all competitions.

In June 2011, Edwards signed for Stevenage on a free transfer. In March 2012, he joined Rochdale on loan until the end of the 2011–12 season. Released by Stevenage in May 2012, he signed for Rochdale on a permanent basis in August 2012. After a season of regular first-team football at Rochdale, Edwards joined League Two club Burton Albion in June 2013. He helped the club earn back-to-back promotions into the Championship during his time there. Following a loan spell at Oxford United during the 2016–17 season, he was released by Burton and signed for Bury. After one season back at Accrington, Edwards signed for Warrington Town in November 2020.

Career

Early career
Edwards started his career at Wigan Athletic, signing a professional contract with the club at the age of 18. He was sent out on a one-month loan to Morecambe in September 2004 in order to gain first-team experience. However, Edwards made just one appearance for the club, coming on as a substitute in the 36th minute of a 2–2 draw away at Northwich Victoria. He returned to Wigan in October 2004, playing regularly for the reserve team, although did not make any first-team appearances for the club.

Accrington Stanley
Edwards signed for Accrington Stanley on loan in October 2005, making his debut in a 3–3 Football League Trophy draw away at Rotherham United. He made his league debut on 29 October 2005, playing the whole match as Accrington beat York City 2–1 at the Crown Ground. During Edwards' first six games at Accrington, the club had won all six fixtures, conceding just two goals. This form had propelled the club to the top of the Conference National. His loan was later extended until the end of the 2005–06 season in November 2005. After playing regularly during the loan agreement, Edwards signed for Accrington on a permanent basis on 12 January 2006. Edwards was part of the team that earned promotion to the Football League following a 1–0 away victory at Woking on 15 April 2006. He played 27 times for Accrington during the campaign.

He was an unused substitute in Accrington's first two games back in the Football League, both of which resulted in 2–0 defeats. He came on as an 85th-minute substitute in the club's 2–1 home win against Barnet in the following game on 12 August 2006, Accrington's first win of the 2006–07 season. He scored his first professional goal in a 3–3 home draw with Shrewsbury Town on 2 December 2006, scoring a header in the 55th-minute to restore parity after Accrington were trailing in the match. Edwards' last game of the 2006–07 season was in a 3–2 home win against Macclesfield Town, a win that ultimately secured the club's Football League status for another year. He played 39 times in all competitions that season, scoring one goal. He opted to remain at Accrington ahead of the 2007–08 season, signing a contract extension on 8 May 2007. He played his first game of the campaign on 25 August 2007, a 2–0 defeat at Lincoln City. Despite playing sporadically during the first half of the season, Edwards was ever-present in the first-team from December 2007 onwards. He scored his first goal of the 2007–08 season on 4 April 2008, the winning goal in a 1–0 win against Dagenham & Redbridge. The goal helped secure League Two survival for Accrington. It was his only goal of the season, playing 32 games in all competitions.

Remaining at Accrington for the 2008–09 season, Edwards made his first appearance of the campaign in a 1–0 home defeat to newly promoted Aldershot Town on 9 August 2008. Accrington manager John Coleman praised Edwards for his form during the start of the season in October 2008, stating "I couldn't pay him enough compliments. I think the last six months he has been absolutely magnificent. I am convinced if he was three inches bigger he would be playing in the Premier League. He is our best defender and hopefully he'll continue to be a great player for us for a long time". Edwards remained a first-team regular before being substituted after 17 minutes in Accrington's 2–1 win against Shrewsbury Town on 21 October 2008. Despite needing eight stitches in his knee, Edwards played in Accrington's following league match four days later, a 1–0 home defeat to Wycombe Wanderers. Edwards played in all of Accrington's 50 games during the 2008–09 season, with the club finishing in 16th position in the league table. He signed a new two-year contract at Accrington. He scored his first goal of the 2009–10 season on 22 August 2009, "bundling" the ball into the goal from John Miles' corner kick in a 3–1 loss at Aldershot Town. Edwards scored nine times from central defence during the 2009–10 season, playing all 57 of the club's matches as Accrington finished in 15th place in League Two.

He scored his first and second goals of the 2010–11 season on 2 October 2010, when he scored twice from the penalty spot in Accrington's 7–4 home win against Gillingham.  Accrington cemented a place in the League Two play-offs after finishing in fifth place in League Two, Edwards played in both of the semi-final matches against Stevenage, which Accrington lost by a 3–0 aggregate scoreline. Edwards scored 13 goals from defence in 51 appearances during Accrington's 2010–11 campaign, finishing as Accrington's joint top goalscorer for the season alongside Terry Gornell and Sean McConville. He was offered a two-year contract extension at the end of the season. Accrington assistant manager Jimmy Bell stated "Phil has been offered a good deal and we're quietly confident, although there have been a few rumours about one or two clubs being interested. But Phil has been here since he was young, he can't drive, he gets looked after by the club and he gets lifts in to training, so he feels quite settled here". Edwards played 257 games for Accrington, scoring 24 goals.

Stevenage
Edwards signed for League One club Stevenage on 27 June 2011. He joined the club on a free transfer, rejecting a contract extension at Accrington. He signed a one-year deal with Stevenage, with the option of a second year. On joining the club he said "I wasn't particularly looking for another club and I didn't have any interest in any other clubs at the time, so I thought I'd still be at Accrington next season. However, the manager got in touch with my agent and discussed the offer and when I thought I had the chance of playing League One football I decided to sign for Stevenage". He made his Stevenage debut on the first day of the 2011–12 season, playing the whole match in a 0–0 home draw against Exeter City. Edwards made 13 starting appearances for the club, as well as a further 14 appearances from the substitutes' bench, during the first half of the club's first ever League One campaign.

Rochdale
After falling out of favour under new Stevenage manager Gary Smith, Edwards joined Rochdale on 9 March 2012, on a loan agreement until the end of the 2011–12 season. The move re-united him with manager John Coleman, who had managed Edwards for six years at Accrington Stanley. He made his first appearance for Rochdale a day after signing for the club, on 10 March 2012, coming on as a 61st-minute substitute as Rochdale came back twice to draw 2–2 against Huddersfield Town. Edwards made just three appearances for Rochdale during his loan spell due to a knee injury. At the end of the season, Edwards was released by Stevenage when his contract expired, after just one year at the club. He made 27 appearances during his time at Stevenage. Ahead of the 2012–13 season, Edwards signed for Rochdale on a permanent basis having briefly played on loan there the previous season. He signed a one-year deal with the club. He played regularly throughout the campaign, making 48 appearances in all competitions as Rochdale finished the campaign in a mid-table position.

Burton Albion
He opted to leave Rochdale after his first full season there, signing for fellow League Two club Burton Albion on a free transfer on 29 June 2013. On signing Edwards, Burton manager Gary Rowett stated "In Phil we have a player who knows what it takes to be successful at this level as well as the league above and he is a very consistent performer. At 27 he's also at a good age to continue progressing and I'm sure he'll prove to be a big asset to the club". He made his Burton debut in the club's first match of the 2013–14 season, a 2–2 draw with Cheltenham Town on 3 August 2013. Edwards scored his first goal for the club in a 1–0 away victory at Exeter City on 26 October 2013. He played regularly in defence during his first season with the club, making 51 appearances and scoring two goals, as Burton missed out on promotion after losing 1–0 to Fleetwood Town in the 2014 Football League Two play-off Final.

He scored six times in 50 matches the following season as Burton finished the 2014–15 season as League Two champions. This included goals in Burton's final two matches of the season, victories against Northampton Town and Cambridge United, as the club secured the League Two title on the final day of the season. Edwards signed a new one-year contract with Burton on 8 May 2015 and was once again a mainstay in the Burton defence during the 2015–16 campaign, making 49 appearances in all competitions. Burton finished the season in second-place in League One, meaning they had earned back-to-back promotions to the Championship. During his time at Burton, Edwards played 151 times and scored eight goals, and was described as having earned "cult hero status" during his three years there.

Loan to Oxford United
After making just one appearance for Burton in the opening month of the 2016–17 season, Edwards made the move back into League One when he signed a season-long loan contract with Oxford United on 19 August 2016. Burton manager Nigel Clough stated that whilst he did not want to loan out Edwards, it would have been "selfish" to keep him in the squad just in case of injuries. He debuted for Oxford a day later, playing the whole match in a 2–1 victory against Peterborough United. His equalising goal away at Scunthorpe United on 26 November 2016 served as his first goal for the club, and he went on to score five times from right-back during the season, making 51 appearances. This included eight appearances in the EFL Trophy, as Oxford lost to Coventry City in the EFL Trophy Final at Wembley Stadium.

Bury
Released by Burton at the end of the season, Edwards signed a two-year contract with League One club Bury on 14 May 2017. He tore a cartilage in his knee during pre-season, undergoing surgery in July 2017. Edwards returned to fitness and made his Bury debut in a 0–0 draw with former club Rochdale on 26 August 2017. Edwards played 42 times during the campaign, as Bury were relegated to League Two after finishing in last place in the League One standings. Edwards made just three appearances during the 2018–19 season, all of which came in the EFL Trophy. He left the club upon the expiry of his contract in June 2019.

Return to Accrington
Without a club at the start of the 2019–20 season, Edwards rejoined Accrington Stanley on a one-year contract on 1 August 2019. It was the third time Edwards had been signed by manager John Coleman, who stated signing Edwards once more was a "no risk signing". He made his first appearance back at Accrington as an 89th-minute substitute in the club's 2–1 victory over Milton Keynes Dons on 31 August 2019. Edwards played a peripheral role during his one year back at Accrington, making eight appearances in all competitions. He was released by Accrington on 24 June 2020.

Warrington Town
Edwards signed for Northern Premier League club Warrington Town on 3 November 2020. Warrington's 2020–21 season was curtailed due to the COVID-19 pandemic before he made any first-team appearances.

Style of play
Edwards has been deployed in a number of positions throughout his career and his versatility to play across all back four defensive positions has been highlighted as one of his strengths. At Stevenage, Edwards was also used in a defensive midfield role whereby he would offer additional protection in front of the back four. He was a regular penalty-kick taker at Accrington, scoring over 20 times from the penalty spot. Edwards has been praised for his worth ethic both in training and during matches.

Personal life
Born in Bootle, Merseyside, Edwards is a supporter of Everton.

Career statistics

Honours
Accrington Stanley
Conference National: 2005–06

Burton Albion
League One runner-up: 2014–15
League Two: 2014–15

Oxford United
EFL Trophy runner-up: 2016–17

Individual
PFA Team of the Year: 2014–15 League Two

References

External links

1985 births
Living people
Sportspeople from Bootle
Footballers from Merseyside
English footballers
Association football defenders
Wigan Athletic F.C. players
Morecambe F.C. players
Accrington Stanley F.C. players
Stevenage F.C. players
Rochdale A.F.C. players
Burton Albion F.C. players
Oxford United F.C. players
Bury F.C. players
Warrington Town F.C. players
National League (English football) players
English Football League players